The siege of Ruthven Barracks by Jacobite rebels of a small group of government soldiers  took place in August 1745 and was part of the Jacobite rising of 1745.

Background
On 29 August 1745 a force of 300 Jacobite rebels marched on the Government held Ruthven Barracks. The barracks were under the command of Sergeant Terrance Molloy who had with him only 14 private soldiers. The Jacobites came to the gate of the barracks and demanded that Molloy surrender. Molloy was defiant and refused despite the Jacobites telling him that they would hang him and his men if he refused. The Jacobites then retreated some distance.

The assault
At nightfall around about 150 Jacobites returned and attacked the barracks. They set fire to the door gate but the defending soldiers managed to put it out. The man who started the fire was spotted and became an early victim. At about half past three in the morning the Jacobites withdrew. Sergeant Molloy then agreed to speak to two of the Jacobite leaders but he still refused terms of surrender. However, Molloy did agree to allow the Jacobites to remove their dead and wounded. The Jacobites had lost two men dead and several others wounded. The Government soldiers had only lost one man, who had been killed when he raised his head above the parapet, despite orders to keep his head down.

Aftermath
The Jacobites then left Ruthven but not without stealing many provisions from the residents of Ruthven Village. Sergeant Molloy was immediately promoted to the rank of lieutenant. On 10 February 1746, 300 Jacobites returned to attack Ruthven Barracks again and this time they had the advantage of having brought artillery with them.

References

See also
Siege of Ruthven Barracks (1746)
Jacobite risings
Jacobite rising of 1745

Conflicts in 1745
1745 in Scotland
Ruthven